David Burnham Tanner is a Distinguished Professor of Physics and an affiliate professor in the Department of Chemistry at the University of Florida. 

He studied at the University of Virginia where he received his B. A. degree. He has a PhD in Physics from Cornell University.

He was elected a Fellow of the American Physical Society in 1989 "for studies of the basic infrared properties of new materials". and awarded their Frank Isakson Prize for Optical Effects in Solids in 2016.

He published the textbook Optical Effects in Solids in 2019.

References

1945 births
Living people
University of Florida faculty
21st-century American physicists
University of Virginia alumni
Cornell University alumni
Fellows of the American Physical Society